The Cycle Savages is a 1969 American outlaw biker exploitation film written and directed by Bill Brame, and stars Bruce Dern and Melody Patterson. The film follows a biker and his crew who go after an artist who sketched his nude girlfriend. It premiered in Charlotte, North Carolina on August 22, 1969. Casey Kasem served as one of the film's producers.

Plot

Romko is an artist, and he's sketching biker gang leader Keeg.  Keeg is running a white slavery operation in Las Vegas and doesn't want to be incriminated, so he attacks Romko, and slashes his hands to protect the gang's anonymity.  One of the gangs followers, Lea, takes Romko back to her apartment and calls for Docky to help mend his hands.  Docky provides the distraction while Keeg and his gang ransack Romko's apartment, and steal all the remaining sketches.  Lea offers to pose nude for Romko, which leads to a romantic sexual interlude the next day.  In the meantime the gang has kidnaped a local high school girl, Janie, intent in turning her to prostitution.  Keeg and the entire gang rape Janie, then pump her full of a large dose of LSD.  Keeg then forces another girl, Sandy, to engage in a gangbang with the gang.  When the police arrive at Romko's apartment to question him about the attack that Keeg made on him, but Romko refuses to incriminate Keeg.  This ends with Romko and Lea being arrested, but they are released the next day.  The bikers then grab Romko, drag him to an abandoned cellar, and torture him by crushing his hands in a vice.  When Lea finds them she pulls a gun, but is afraid to shoot.  Then another girl grabs the gun and shoots Keeg.  The rest of the gang are arrested and charged for the rape of Janie.

Cast
 Bruce Dern as Keeg
 Melody Patterson as Lea
 Chris Robinson as Romko
 Maray Ayres as Sandy
 Karen Ciral as Janie
 Mike Mehas as Bob
 Jack Konzel as Bartender
 Walter Robles as Tom
 Joe McManus
 Jerry Taylor  as storekeeper
 Denise Gilbert as the little girl
 Daniel Gaffouri as Marvin
 Anna Sugano as Motorcycle Girl
 Gary Littlejohn as Motorcycle boy
 Ron Godwin as Walter
 Lee Chandler as Doug
 Marjorie Dayne as Motorcycle girl
 Lydia Banks
 Randee Lee as One of the girls
 Peter Fain as Police detective (Sam)
 Casey Kasem as Keeg's brother
 Scott Brady as Vice Squad Detective
 Steve Brodie as Police Detective
 Tom Daly as Docky
 Virginia Hawkins as Woman

See also
 Outlaw biker film

References

External links
 
 

1969 films
American exploitation films
American International Pictures films
Motorcycling films
Outlaw biker films
Films scored by Jerry Styner
1970s exploitation films
1970s English-language films
1960s English-language films
1960s American films
1970s American films